Zuiyen Rais (13 December 1940 – 10 November 2022) was an Indonesian politician. He served as Mayor of Padang from 1993 to 1999 and again from 2000 to 2003.

Rais died in Padang on 10 November 2022, at the age of 81.

References

1940 births
2022 deaths
Indonesian politicians
Indonesian academics
Mayors of Padang
Minangkabau people
People from West Sumatra